Twenty Twelve is a BBC television comedy series written and directed by John Morton. Starring Hugh Bonneville, Jessica Hynes and Amelia Bullmore, the programme is a spoof on-location mockumentary following the organisation of the 2012 Summer Olympics in London. It was first broadcast on UK television station BBC Four in March 2011 to coincide with the 500-day countdown to the opening ceremony.

Twenty Twelve gained mainly positive reviews from critics, and a four-part second series was announced on 15 April 2011, which began airing on 30 March 2012 on BBC Two. A further three episodes of series 2 began airing from 10 July 2012. The series' last episode was broadcast on 24 July 2012, three days before the opening ceremony of the London Olympic Games.

Several core characters went on to appear in a sequel, W1A, in 2014.

Plot
The series follows the trials of the management of the fictional Olympic Deliverance Commission (ODC), the body tasked to organise the 2012 London Summer Olympics. Over the series, the ODC have to overcome logistical difficulties, production errors, infrastructure problems and troublesome contributors. The main character is Ian Fletcher, the Head of Deliverance, who is in overall charge of the ODC, and is generally efficient but often has to clean up a PR disaster after the other managers make a mistake. A running thread in series one are the hints that his marriage to a high-flying lawyer is breaking down, which comes to a head in episode six. It is evident that his PA Sally is in love with him, although this remains unspoken.

Meanwhile, Siobhan Sharpe is the excitable, but ultimately clueless Head of Brand through her PR company Perfect Curve. She answers almost every problem with phrases that have almost no substance whatsoever, and never turns her phone off during meetings with the other managers. Consequently, the rest of the managers find her ideas and enthusiastic attitude tiresome, particularly Nick Jowett, Head of Contracts, a blunt Yorkshireman who generally opposes ideas without making alternative suggestions, whilst emphasising that he is from Yorkshire. Jowett briefly becomes Acting Head of Deliverance in Series 2 when Ian Fletcher becomes incapacitated.

Kay Hope, Head of Sustainability, is in charge of sorting out what will happen to the buildings, stadia and other Olympic venues after the games. Hope is emphatic that Legacy is something separate from Sustainability although no one makes any attempt to differentiate these two apparently identical areas. She continually mentions that she is a single mother after a bitter divorce, and is paranoid about her public image. In series two Fi Healey joins the team as a new 'Head of Legacy', and instantly becomes Kay's nemesis due to being younger, ambitious and career savvy; the pair constantly clash. Finally, Head of Infrastructure Graham Hitchens gives the impression that he knows everything about the London transport and traffic systems, but is completely ignorant, has no clue about deadlines and frequently upsets various officials.

Cast

Episodes

Series 1

Series 2

Reviews

Critical reviews
Reviews for episode 1 were mixed, commenting that it was milder in its satire than they expected; Ed Cumming in The Telegraph stated "Perhaps it just needs some time to settle. Though it was very funny in parts, the first episode of Twenty Twelve suggests that the series, like the actual cost of the Olympics, might hit slightly wide of its ample target." Likewise, Sam Wollaston in The Guardian suggested that due to the participation of Seb Coe it was "on song": "Biting satire this isn't. It's nibbling satire, delivered by Garra Rufa fish...The Thick of It is a lot more entertaining...I don't think that politicians were removing their shoes, rolling up their trousers and queuing up for cameos in The Thick of It". Brian Viner, writing in The Independent was more impressed by Coe's cameo; "There is surely no other country in the world that would laugh at itself in this way, even persuading the vast project's principal mover-and-shaker, in our case the Rt Hon Lord Coe KBE, to participate in the joke". He went on to commend the series "...I was hooked anyway, by the mischief in John Morton's script and the beautifully nuanced performances of, in particular, Hugh Bonneville and Jessica Hynes".

Brian Viner, reviewing the series as a whole stated the series was "always amusing and sporadically very funny... It's hard to think of a spoof documentary that has been more fortuitously timed than Twenty Twelve."

Real-life similarities
It was widely commented upon in the press that the day after the broadcast of the first episode, which features problems with the 1,000-day countdown clock, the real-life clock in Trafalgar Square broke soon after it had been launched by Lord Coe and London mayor Boris Johnson.

An additional coincidence occurred when some of the first athletes to arrive in London for the Olympics suffered delays; their bus drivers were unfamiliar with London and unable to find the Olympic Park in scenes that closely resembled the plot of episode 2.

The Games plagiarism accusation
Twenty Twelve has been criticised as bearing a strong resemblance to the Australian mockumentary series The Games, a similar series set before the 2000 Sydney Olympics. Writer of The Games John Clarke said, "We worked very hard on that project and we had long conversations with these people who've now done a show like that in Britain".

The BBC denied claims of plagiarism. "It is a very different show, the only similarities between them are that they are both set around the Olympics," a corporation source said. Clarke's own website later made a reference to the dispute by describing himself and writing partner as "run[ning] a charitable institute supplying formats to British television".

Awards and nominations
The programme was the winner of the Best Sitcom category at the British Comedy Awards 2011, while Jessica Hynes received the Best Comedy Performance award for her role from the Royal Television Society. For his role in Twenty Twelve Osy Ikhile was nominated for "Best TV Comedy Performance" at the Black International Film Festival and Music Video & Screen Awards.

In May 2013, the programme was awarded title of 'Best Sitcom' at the annual BAFTA awards, with star Olivia Colman also picking up the award for 'Best Female Comedy Performance', a category in which co-star Jessica Hynes was also nominated. Hugh Bonneville also received a nomination for his role of Head of Deliverance, Ian Fletcher.

DVD release
On 23 October 2012 BBC Home Entertainment released the entire series in a two-disc DVD set.

Sequel

After the final episode had aired, there was speculation in the media about a third series with the team liaising with the organisation team of the Rio de Janeiro games in 2016, or becoming management consultants. When asked about whether the hit show could return, main star Bonneville said,  "Absolutely. They could go and help with the organisation of the Rio Games in 2016...but ultimately, this is a crack team that could go anywhere and manage anything – the City, say, or the armed services. The NHS also needs rebranding. They could get Ian in to announce, 'If health is about anything, it's about managing expectations. We have got to get people to appreciate there are a lot of positive things about ill health. We need to make it sexy'."

A sequel was announced by the BBC in late 2013 and broadcast 19 March to 9 April 2014. Named W1A, it follows Ian Fletcher (Bonneville) and Siobhan Sharpe (Jessica Hynes) as they pursue new careers as part of the BBC management team.  A second series was commissioned in September 2014 and broadcast 23 April to 14 May 2015.  A third series began airing on 18 September 2017.

See also
 Olympic Delivery Authority
 London Organising Committee of the Olympic Games and Paralympic Games

References

External links

2011 British television series debuts
2012 British television series endings
2010s British satirical television series
2012 Summer Olympics
BBC television comedy
English-language television shows
British mockumentary television series
Television shows involved in plagiarism controversies